Stepan Fedorovych Yurchyshyn (born 28 August 1957) is a Ukrainian retired football player.
The first team that he coached was FC Karpaty Lviv in 1990, 1992, and then from 1999 to 2006. In 2007, he became a coach of FC Lviv from which he resigned in late September 2008 after the club's poor start in the Ukrainian Premier League.

Honours
 Soviet Top League winner: 1981.

International career
Yurchyshyn made his debut for USSR on 5 September 1979 in a friendly against East Germany. He played in UEFA Euro 1980 qualifiers (USSR did not qualify for the final tournament).

In 1979 Yurchyshyn played couple of games for Ukraine at the Spartakiad of the Peoples of the USSR.

Coaching Record

References

External links
 
  Profile

1957 births
Living people
Soviet footballers
Soviet Union international footballers
Ukrainian footballers
Ukrainian football managers
Soviet Top League players
PFC CSKA Moscow players
FC Karpaty Lviv players
SKA Lviv players
FC SKA-Karpaty Lviv players
FC Podillya Khmelnytskyi players
FC Dynamo Kyiv players
Pakhtakor Tashkent FK players
Ukrainian Premier League managers
FC Karpaty Lviv managers
FC Hazovyk Komarno managers
FC Lviv managers
Association football midfielders
Association football forwards
Sportspeople from Lviv Oblast